Visa requirements for Saudi citizens are administrative entry restrictions by the authorities of other states placed on citizens of Saudi Arabia. As of 2023, Saudi citizens had visa-free or visa on arrival access to 97 countries and territories, ranking the Saudi Arabian passport 50th in terms of travel freedom according to the Global Passport Index.

Saudi citizens do not need a visa to enter other GCC states and reside permanently.

Visa requirements map

Visa requirements

Dependent, disputed, or restricted territories
Unrecognized or partially recognized countries

See also

 Visa policy of Saudi Arabia

References and Notes
References

Notes

Saudi Arabia
Foreign relations of Saudi Arabia